On With It! is an album by organist Jack McDuff recorded in 1961 but not released on the Prestige label until 1971.

Reception
In his review for Allmusic, Scott Yanow states "the results are danceable, yet full of honest feeling and some chance taking within the boundaries of soul-jazz".

Track listing 
All compositions by Jack McDuff except where noted
 "Hey Lawdy Mama" (Jimmy Reed) - 4:04  
 "The Last Goodun'" - 6:49  
 "Dink's Dream" - 3:48  
 "Drown in My Own Tears" (Henry Glover) - 3:09
 "Groanin'" - 8:12 
 "Your Nose Is Open" - 8:15

Personnel 
Jack McDuff - organ
Harold Vick - tenor saxophone
Eddie Diehl - guitar
Joe Dukes - drums

References 

 

Jack McDuff albums
1971 albums
Prestige Records albums
Albums recorded at Van Gelder Studio
Albums produced by Esmond Edwards